The following article contains a list of episodes of the television series Erotas on the ANT1 channel. The episodes are grouped by week. 560 episodes have aired in Greece and Australia and 540 episodes have aired in Cyprus, United States, United Kingdom and Canada, to February 1, 2008. The show premiered on September 8, 2005, and is currently in its third season. The final episode was on 30 May 2008 and there will not be a fourth season unfortunately, even though there were millions watching.

Episodes

Season 1 (2005–2006)

Season 2 (2006–2007)

Season 3 (2007–2008)

Greek-language television shows